Jamaal Anderson (born February 6, 1986) is a former American football defensive end. He was drafted by the Atlanta Falcons eighth overall in the 2007 NFL Draft. He played college football at Arkansas.

Anderson also played for the Indianapolis Colts, Cincinnati Bengals, and Chicago Bears.

Early life
Anderson grew up in Little Rock, Arkansas with parents Glenn and Karen Anderson and a sister, Danielle. His father, Dr. Glenn Anderson, was a professor at the University of Arkansas at Little Rock. The senior Anderson was the first deaf African-American to receive a doctoral degree in the United States. Jamaal was a two-sport athlete at Parkview Arts and Science Magnet High School in Little Rock before focusing on football as a wide receiver his senior season.
Arkansas Razorbacks football coach Houston Nutt and brother Danny Nutt, who had a hearing-impaired father, used American sign language during a recruiting visit; Jamaal committed to Arkansas shortly thereafter on January 15, 2004.

|}

College career 
The Razorbacks switched him to defensive end when Anthony Brown was injured during Anderson's sophomore season. Anderson excelled in his new position. Anderson recorded 17.5 quarterback sacks in his time at Arkansas, with those sacks going for minus 128 yards. He also recorded 130 tackles, with 84 solos. He had 32 stops for losses of 167 yards. He had 35 quarterback pressures, 8 pass deflections, 2 forced fumbles and a fumble recovery in 20 starts. For his role on the 2006 Arkansas Razorbacks football team, Anderson recorded first-team All-Southeastern Conference honors and honorable mention All-America honors. Anderson chose to forgo his senior season at Arkansas, and entered the NFL Draft.

Professional career

Atlanta Falcons
Anderson was drafted with the 8th overall pick by the Atlanta Falcons in the 2007 NFL Draft. The pick used to select Anderson was previously acquired from the Houston Texans in a trade that sent Matt Schaub to Houston. Anderson earned the position of Falcons' starting right defensive end during training camp and started 15 regular season games. He finished the 2007 season with 30 tackles, 1 forced fumble, 3 pass defenses, and 0 quarterback sacks.

Anderson recorded his first sack against Chicago Bears quarterback Kyle Orton on October 12, 2008. He finished the 2008 season with 27 tackles, and two sacks. He moved to defensive tackle after a few games in 2009 due to injuries to the Falcons defensive line and his struggles at end.

On July 29, 2011, he was released by Atlanta. Anderson played in 60 games over four seasons for Atlanta, with 47 starts.

Indianapolis Colts
On August 1, 2011, Anderson signed with the Indianapolis Colts. In a game against the Pittsburgh Steelers on September 25, 2011, Anderson recovered a Ben Roethlisberger fumble caused by Dwight Freeney and returned it 47 yards for his first and only NFL touchdown.

Cincinnati Bengals
Anderson signed with the Cincinnati Bengals on March 23, 2012, and was released on July 10, 2013.

Chicago Bears
Anderson signed with the Chicago Bears on July 25, 2013 for a one-year deal. He was released on August 17, 2013.

NFL statistics

References

External links
Arkansas Razorbacks bio

1986 births
Living people
American football defensive ends
American football defensive tackles
Arkansas Razorbacks football players
Atlanta Falcons players
Chicago Bears players
Cincinnati Bengals players
Indianapolis Colts players
Players of American football from Arkansas
Sportspeople from Little Rock, Arkansas